In France a Unité mixte de recherche (UMR) is an administrative type of research laboratory that is partially supported by CNRS and partially by other organizations, in terms of funds, academic and non-academic staff, and other type of support, based on a multi-year reconducible contract.

References

See also
 Search engine for CNRS laboratories and staff

Research institutes